Presidential elections were held in Chile in 1876. Carried out through a system of electors, they resulted in the election of Aníbal Pinto (the sole candidate) as President.

Results

References

Presidential elections in Chile
Chile
1876 in Chile